Oliver Đokić (also transliterated Oliver Djokić; born 12 August 1981) is a Serbian football midfielder who plays for Radnički Svilajnac in Serbian League East.

References

External links
 
 

1981 births
Living people
People from Svilajnac
Association football midfielders
Serbian footballers
FK Smederevo players
Serbian SuperLiga players